Sir James Robert Walker, 2nd Baronet, of Sand Hutton JP, DL (19 October 1829 – 12 June 1899) was a British Conservative politician.

He was the son of James Walker, 1st Baronet and his first wife Mary Denison. Walker was educated at Christ Church, Oxford and graduated with a Bachelor of Arts in 1851 and a Master of Arts in 1860. In 1883, he succeeded his father as baronet.

Walker, who sometime served with the Yorkshire Hussars, was a Member of Parliament (MP) for Beverley between 1860 and 1865 and High Sheriff of Yorkshire in 1888. He was a Deputy Lieutenant and justice of the peace of the North Riding as well as a justice of the peace of the East Riding of Yorkshire.

On 23 June 1863, Walker married Louisa Susan Marlborough Heron-Maxwell, third daughter of Captain Sir John Heron-Maxwell, 6th Baronet at St James's Church, Piccadilly. They had nine children. Walker was succeeded in the baronetcy by his oldest son James Heron.

In 1890 he bought Bossall Hall, north of York, from William Belt.

References

External links

1829 births
1899 deaths
Alumni of Christ Church, Oxford
Baronets in the Baronetage of the United Kingdom
Deputy Lieutenants of the North Riding of Yorkshire
High Sheriffs of Yorkshire
Conservative Party (UK) MPs for English constituencies
UK MPs 1859–1865
Yorkshire Hussars officers